is a Japanese handball player for Toyota Auto Body and the Japanese national team.

He participated at the 2017 World Men's Handball Championship.

References

Japanese male handball players
Handball players at the 2018 Asian Games
Asian Games competitors for Japan
1987 births
Living people
21st-century Japanese people